Miss Spain 2019 may refer to these events:
Miss Universe Spain 2019, Miss Spain 2019 for Miss Universe 2019
Miss World Spain 2019, Miss Spain 2019 for Miss World 2019